Sid Tickridge (10 April 1923 in Stepney – 6 January 1997 in Canterbury) was a professional footballer who played for Tottenham Hotspur, Chelsea, Brentford and represented England at schoolboy level.

Football career 
Tickridge joined Spurs as a junior in April 1946. He played a total of 101 games in all competitions for the club in the position of full back from 1946 to 1950. Tickridge took part in the push and run side of 1950–51 when he completed one match. He left the club in March 1951 to join Chelsea in a transfer deal, and went on to make 61 appearances. He ended his senior career at Brentford and featured in 62 matches from 1955 to 1956.

External links 
Tottenham Hotspur F.C A-Z of players Retrieved 4 December 2012

References

1923 births
1997 deaths
Footballers from Stepney
Tottenham Hotspur F.C. players
Chelsea F.C. players
Brentford F.C. players
English Football League players
English footballers
Association football fullbacks